Waqra Punta (Quechua waqra horn, punta peak, ridge; first, before, in front of, "horn peak (or ridge)", Hispanicized spelling Huagra Punta) is a mountain in the Andes of Peru which reaches an altitude of approximately  high. It is situated in the Lima Region, Cajatambo Province, Gorgor District, and in the Huaura Province, Ambar District. Waqra Punta lies northeast of Phiri Uya.

References

Mountains of Peru
Mountains of Lima Region